North Carolina's 2nd congressional district is located in the central part of the state. The district contains most of Wake County. Prior to court-mandated redistricting in 2019, it also included northern Johnston County, southern Nash County, far western Wilson County, and all of Franklin and Harnett counties. The 2nd district has been represented by Democratic Rep. Deborah Ross since 2021.

Established by the state legislature after the American Civil War, the district was known as "The Black Second;" counties included in the district were mostly majority-Black in population. All four of North Carolina's Republican African-American congressmen elected in the post-Civil War era (ending with George Henry White) represented this district, as did white yeoman farmer Curtis Hooks Brogden of Wayne County, a Republican ally of former Governor William Woods Holden.

After North Carolina Democrats regained control of the state legislature in the 1870s (using intimidation by the Red Shirts and other paramilitary groups to reduce the number of African Americans voting), they passed voter registration and electoral laws that restricted voter rolls. Black Americans continued getting elected into local and state level offices. The state legislature passed a new constitutional amendment in 1900, which effectively disfranchised blacks altogether. This ended the election of Black Americans to local, state or Congressional offices until after passage of federal civil rights legislation in the mid-1960s, which enforced constitutional voting rights.

Thousands of Black Americans migrated north from the state in the Great Migration during the first half of the twentieth century, seeking job opportunities and education. By the later twentieth century, before the 1990s, the 2nd district was roughly 40% black. While it had the highest percentage of Black residents of any congressional district in North Carolina, African-American candidates were unable to get elected to Congress from the majority-white district.

State redistricting following census changes led to the creation of the black-majority 1st and 12th districts and drew off some of the Black population from the 2nd. Today the proportion of African-American residents is about 20.11% in the 2nd district.

In 2019, court-mandated redistricting shifted the district entirely into urban Wake County. Incumbent Republican representative George Holding declined to run for re-election in 2020, and Democratic Rep. Deborah Ross won election to the seat.

On February 23, 2022, the North Carolina Supreme Court approved a new map which changed the 2nd district boundaries to include northern Wake County while moving much of what had been the 2nd district to the 13th district. 

Wake County is the sole county in the district.

List of members representing the district

Election results

2000

2002

2004

2006

2008

2010

2012

2014

2016

2018

2020

2022

See also

 North Carolina's congressional districts
 List of United States congressional districts

References

 
 
 Congressional Biographical Directory of the United States 1774–present

External links

02